The Special Intelligence Department is headed by the Police Brigadier Generals of the Republic of the Union of Myanmar. Their job is to issue passports, to carry out investigations, and to ensure security for the homeland.

Law enforcement in Myanmar
National security